The Los Angeles Kickers were an amateur American soccer team established in 1951. The club won the National Challenge Cup, now known as the U.S. Open Cup, in 1958 and 1964.

In 1951, Albert Ebert and Fritz Ermert founded the Los Angeles Kickers as a predominantly German immigrant team.  Within a few seasons, it shed its German identity and became a powerhouse southern California team, winning the 1956 California State Cup.  In 1958, the Kickers won the first of seven straight state cups.  That year, it also won the 1958 National Challenge Cup.  The Kickers lost the 1960 National Challenge Cup final to the Philadelphia Ukrainian Nationals and finished second to St. Stephens in the league standings. In 1963, the Kickers merged with Los Angeles Victoria and won the 1964 National Challenge Cup as the Los Angeles Kickers-Victoria, or LA-KV according to some accounts.  The Kickers continued to absorb or merge with other clubs, namely Germania in 1966, Hollywood in 1972 and Alemania in 1975.  The team is now known as the Los Angeles Soccer Club.

References

External links
 History of Soccer in Greater Los Angeles
 Los Angeles Soccer Club

 
1951 establishments in California
Association football clubs established in 1951
U.S. Open Cup winners